Charlottenborg may refer to:
Charlottenborg manor house, Motala, Sweden
An area in Motala, Sweden, surrounding the Charlottenborg manor house
Charlottenborg Palace, Copenhagen, Denmark
Kunsthal Charlottenborg, an art gallery in Copenhagen, Denmark

See also
Charlottenberg
Charlottenburg